The Australian national junior handball team is the national under-21 handball team of Australia. Controlled by the Australian Handball Federation it represents Australia in international matches.

Tournament summary

Oceania Nations Cup

World Championship

IHF Inter-Continental Trophy

References

External links
Official website

Handball in Australia
Men's national junior handball teams
Handball - Junior men's